Mrs Woodham (formerly Smith; née Spencer) was an entertainer known in both Dublin and London with the nickname "Buck Spencer".

She was born in the United Kingdom in or before 1743, apparently surnamed Spencer. She studied under Thomas Arne and she appeared at the Smock Alley Theatre in the 1750s. She performed in his Comus.

Next, she performed at Marylebone Gardens, in the early 1770s. She moved from London to Dublin, Ireland. Woodham married a name with the surname Smith. She had a daughter. Mr. Smith died, and his widow married a man with the surname Woodham. Eventually, they divorced. She lived with her daughter's family. Mrs. Woodham was said to have died of suffocation and burns in a fire at Astley's theatre on 2 February 1803. She heard the alarm of fire and came to the door (or window) where egress awaited but returned for a dress or to secure the receipts of the house for the last two nights, which were in her charge. She died of smoke inhalation. Her body was burnt with little remaining for burial. Her surname, which appeared as "Woodham" in the Gentleman's Magazine, was given in the Monthly Mirror as "Woodman", and it was noted that a similar actress named "Mrs Woodman" may have been the decedent.

There was an actress "from England" called Mrs Woodham performing in Philadelphia in 1806 who was employed for her comical and musical skills.

References

1743 births
1803 deaths
18th-century British women singers
British stage actresses
18th-century British actresses
Actresses from London
Singers from London
Actresses from Dublin (city)
Singers from Dublin (city)
Deaths by smoke inhalation
Deaths from fire
Accidental deaths in England